Janette Anne Dimech (born 10 October 1951), known professionally as Jeanette, is a Spanish singer. She first rose to prominence as the lead singer of Pic-Nic, a teenage folk-pop band that topped the charts in 1968 with her song "Cállate, niña". Jeanette returned as a solo artist in 1971 with the Hispavox single "Soy rebelde", which redefined her career as a romantic balladist and was a hit across the Spanish-speaking world, becoming a generational anthem.

In 1976, Carlos Saura included Jeanette's 1974 song "Porque te vas" in his film Cría cuervos, which propelled it to become a major hit and one of the most famous Spanish pop songs of all time. After the international success of "Porque te vas", Jeanette worked in France and Germany until she returned to the Spanish market with the 1981 album Corazón de poeta, which includes several of her most famous songs. The commercial reception of Corazón de poeta allowed her to record two more albums with RCA Victor—Reluz in 1983 and Ojos en el sol in 1984—which were unsuccessful. Her last studio album, Loca por la música, was released in 1989 on independent record label Twins and sought to reinvent her style with techno-pop influences.

The figure of Jeanette has been revalued in the 21st century and she is now considered a cult artist and an influence on Spanish-language indie pop. In 2010, 20 minutos described Jeanette as "a legend of Spanish music and muse of independent pop".

Biography 

Dimech's father is of Maltese descent who lived in the Belgian Congo and a Spanish mother originally from the Canary Islands. Because of her grandparents' import-export business, she was born in the London suburb of Willesden, and grew up in Chicago and La Habra, California. After her parents' separation when she was 12, she moved to Barcelona with her mother and younger brother and sister. Having grown up in the United States, she spoke only English when she first moved to Spain. She was placed in an American school at first, but later befriended some local Spanish children who helped teach her Spanish.

After her band, Pic-Nic split up at the end of the 1960s, Jeanette moved to Vienna with her husband, Hungarian football player László Kristof, and lived quietly as a homemaker and the mother of their only child, Blythe.

Pic-Nic 

During the 1960s Jeanette learned to play guitar and began to write her own songs. She styled her music after American folk music, and her idols included Bob Dylan, Donovan, and the Byrds.  Later she joined the student band Pic-Nic as a singer, and in 1967 they had a measure of success with a folk version of the Spanish children's song "Cállate, niña" (in which Jeanette had co-written).  Other notable songs of theirs included "Amanecer" and "No digas nada". However, constant disagreements among members, such as whether or not to record English versions of their songs, ended with the dissolution of the group.

Palabras, promesas 
After the dissolution of Pic-Nic, Jeanette resumed her course, but overnight received a call from her former record label Hispavox, the same label she was on during her tenure with Pic-Nic. This time the label said that they had a project for a singer and Jeanette must be it. She came back to Spain and to the music. Jeanette settled in Barcelona in 1971 to start her solo career. At the start of the 1970s, she began her solo career with her hit first single, "Soy Rebelde" ("I am a rebel"). On the single, the record label misspelt her name as "Jeanette" (her correct spelling is Janette without the first "e".) Ever since then, her stage name has been spelt with the additional "e".  The single first enjoyed success in Spanish-speaking countries and later broadened its influence with French ("L'inconnu qui m'aimera"), Japanese ("あまのじゃく") and English versions. This song and others penned by Manuel Alejandro, such as "Estoy triste" and "Oye mamá, oye papá" ("Listen mama, listen papa"), established her as an artist in Spain. Palabras, promesas ("Words, promises"), written by José Luis Perales was released in 1973. In this LP were released all the singles and recorded from 1971 to 1973.

"Porque te vas" 
Her greatest success, "Porque te vas" (Because you are leaving), written by José Luis Perales, became an international hit when the song was used in Carlos Saura's 1976 film Cría Cuervos (Raise Ravens). In Austria it reached number 13, in Switzerland number 4, and in Germany reached number 1. On 12 February 1977, Jeanette sang the song in the popular German program Musikladen (programme 31).  The song also enjoyed popularity in Russia; still often heard on Retro FM, a nationwide Russian station. It was, and still is, often heard on the national radio in Poland. The song had been released in Spain two years prior to the movie with moderate success. It was its inclusion in the movie that made it a success.

Todo es nuevo 
Jeanette worked with famous French composer André Popp for the production of her album Todo es nuevo (Everything is new) in 1977. There were two versions: Spanish and French. The album received a lukewarm reception, but the song "¿Por qué voy a cambiar?" (Why Should I Change?) (Tzeinerlin' in French) also appeared in the German programme Musikladen (programme 35, 8 October 1977).

Corazón de poeta 

In 1981 she recorded her best-selling album to date, Corazón de poeta, which was composed, arranged and conducted by Manuel Alejandro, and gave her three hit singles: "Corazón de poeta" (literally "Heart of a Poet" but translated as "A heart so warm and so tender"), "Frente a Frente" (literally "Face to Face" but translated as "Sorrow") and "El muchacho de los ojos tristes" ("The Young Man With The Sad Eyes").  Especially as a  vintage album, it sold millions worldwide, triumphing across borders, in several Latin American countries.  In Spain it was the number-one album for a week; of the singles, "Frente a frente" reached #4 during a 20 weeks run on the charts, and "Corazón de poeta" reached #13 during its 10 weeks on the charts.

In the next several years she released the albums Reluz (1983), Ojos en el Sol (1984), and Loca por la Música (1989), along with a string of singles.  Her sales then declined, though she herself remained popular and her back catalogue was re-packaged into a continual stream of greatest-hits collections.

Discography

Singles 
Brenner's Folk
 1966: "Daurat Oest/Ho se/Clara Lluna/Amor Perdut"

Pic-Nic:
 1967: "Cállate, niña/Negra estrella"
 1968: "Amanecer/No digas nada"
 1968: "Me olvidarás/Él es distinto a ti"
 1968: "Hush, Little Baby/Blamin's Not Hard To Do/You Heard My Voice"

Jeanette:
 1971: "Soy rebelde/Oye papá, oye mamá"
 1972: "Estoy triste/No digas nada"
 1973: "Palabras, promesas/Debajo del platanero"
 1974: "Porque te vas/Seguiré amando"
 1975: "Hoy nos hemos dicho adiós/El mundo con amor"
 1977: "Todo es nuevo/Pequeña preciosa"
 1978: "No digas buenas noches/Heaven, please, don't let it rain tonight"
 1978: "Voy a tener un niño/De mujer a mujer"
 1981: "Frente a frente/Cuando estoy con él"
 1981: "Corazón de poeta/Comiénzame a vivir"
 1981: "Sorrow/A Heart so warm and so tender"
 1982: "El muchacho de los ojos tristes/Toda la noche oliendo a ti"
 1983: "Reluz/Más de cien sentidos"
 1983: "Con qué derecho/No me fio más"
 1984: "Amiga mía/Baila conmigo"
 1984: "Ojos en el sol/Buenas noches"
 1989: "China/Por nada del mundo"
 1989: "Loca por la música/Sinceridad"

Albums 

Pic-Nic
 1968: Pic-Nic
 1969: Cállate niña (international reissue)

Jeanette
 1973: Palabras, promesas
 1976: Porque te vas
 1977: Todo es nuevo
 1981: Corazón de poeta
 1983: Reluz
 1984: Ojos en el sol
 1988: Loca por la música

Compilations 
 1995: Sus Más Lindas Canciones
 1996: Sigo rebelde
 1998: Coleccion Original
 2002: Soy Rebelde
 2003: 15 Canciones Favoritas
 2004: 15 de Colección
 2005: 20 Éxitos Originales
 2008: Lo Esencial
 2015: De Cerca: 20 Canciones Esenciales

References 

Other sources
 

Living people
Singers from London
Singers from Barcelona
Naturalised citizens of Spain
British emigrants to Spain
Spanish women singers
Spanish people of Democratic Republic of the Congo descent
American people of Canarian descent
English people of Canarian descent
Spanish people of Maltese descent
English people of Maltese descent
English people of Spanish descent
British expatriates in Spain
American expatriates in Spain
American expatriates in England
Spanish expatriates in England
1951 births